The Courier's New Bicycle (2011) is a novel by Australian author Kim Westwood. It was shortlisted for the 2012 Ned Kelly Awards for Best First Crime Novel, and won the 2011 Aurealis Award and the 2012 Ditmar Award for Best Novel.

Plot summary
The novel is set in a Melbourne of the future, when the rate of human reproductive success has dropped markedly as a result of reactions to a hastily developed and widely distributed flu vaccine.  A thriving black market in fertility treatments has arisen, facilitated by Salisbury Forth, the courier of the title.

Reviews
Niall Harrison on Strange Horizons noted that the novel is "perhaps more than anything else a story about identity, about the tension between who you say you are and who they say you are."

Awards and nominations
 2011 winner Aurealis Awards for Excellence in Australian Speculative Fiction – Science Fiction Division – Best Novel  
 2011 shortlisted James Tiptree Jr. Award – Best Novel  
 2012 winner Ditmar Awards – Best Novel 
 2012 shortlisted Davitt Award – Best Adult Crime Novel 
 2012 shortlisted Ned Kelly Awards for Crime Writing – Best First Novel

References

2011 Australian novels
Australian science fiction novels
Australian crime novels
Voyager Books books